Owen Lambe (born August 15, 2000) is an American soccer player who currently plays as a defender for Orange County SC in the USL Championship.

Career

College
Lambe played one season of college soccer at California State University, Fullerton, where he scored 2 goals and tallied 1 assist in 19 appearances for Titans. The 2020 season was cancelled due to the COVID-19 pandemic.

Professional
On April 27, 2021, Lambe signed with USL Championship side LA Galaxy II. Lambe made his professional debut on April 30, 2021, starting in a 1–0 loss to Sacramento Republic.

Lambe joined Orange County SC in January 2023.

References

External links
 

2000 births
Living people
Association football defenders
American soccer players
Cal State Fullerton Titans men's soccer players
LA Galaxy II players
LA Galaxy players
Orange County SC players
Soccer players from California
USL Championship players
Sportspeople from Santa Barbara, California